Alex Porfirio de Lima (born 29 May 1988, in Alvorada) is a Brazilian footballer.

Career
In 2012 he played for Velo Clube in Campeonato Paulista Série A2.

External links
Profile at BATE website

1988 births
Living people
Brazilian footballers
Association football forwards
Brazilian expatriate footballers
Expatriate footballers in Belarus
São Carlos Futebol Clube players
FC BATE Borisov players
Associação Esportiva Velo Clube Rioclarense players
Esporte Clube Taubaté players
Associação Atlética Internacional (Limeira) players